Dieter Bartels (28 March 1920 – 3 September 2010) was a German art director. He is sometimes credited as F. Dieter Bartels.

Selected filmography
 Victoria and Her Hussar (1954)
 Island of the Dead (1955)
 Lost Child 312 (1955)
 How Do I Become a Film Star? (1955)
 Secrets of the City (1955)
 The Marriage of Doctor Danwitz (1956)
 Three Birch Trees on the Heath (1956)
 Widower with Five Daughters (1957)
 The Big Chance (1957)
 Tired Theodore (1957)
 The Legs of Dolores (1957)
 Night Nurse Ingeborg (1958)
 Doctor Crippen Lives (1958)
 Yes, Women are Dangerous (1960)
 Question 7 (1961)
 Escape from East Berlin (1962)
 Stop Train 349 (1963)
 Angels of the Street (1969)
 No Gold for a Dead Diver (1974)
 Bloodline (1979)

References

Bibliography
 Sweeney, Kevin. James Mason: A Bio-bibliography. Greenwood Publishing Group, 1999.

External links

1920 births
2010 deaths
German art directors
Film directors from Hamburg